Group F of the UEFA Women's Euro 2022 qualifying competition consisted of five teams: Sweden, Iceland, Hungary, Slovakia, and Latvia. The composition of the nine groups in the qualifying group stage was decided by the draw held on 21 February 2019, 13:30 CET (UTC+1), at the UEFA headquarters in Nyon, Switzerland. with the teams seeded according to their coefficient ranking.

The group was played in home-and-away round-robin format between August 2019 and December 2020. The group winners and the three best runners-up among all nine groups (not counting results against the sixth-placed team) qualified directly for the final tournament, while the remaining six runners-up advance to the play-offs.

On 17 March 2020, all matches were put on hold due to the COVID-19 pandemic.

Standings

Matches
Times are CET/CEST, as listed by UEFA (local times, if different, are in parentheses).

Goalscorers

Notes

References

External links
Women's Euro Matches: 2021 Qualifying, UEFA.com

Group F